Biz Stream is a weekly business news programme aired on NHK's international broadcasting service NHK World-Japan, hosted by Shaula Vogue and Raja Pradhan. It premiered 7 April 2018; it airs three times a month, on weekends, with an extra repeat on Wednesday early mornings (JST).

The programme usually enters hiatus from late April to early May (Golden Week), in late summer, and from mid-December to mid-January. Due to the COVID-19 pandemic in Japan, the programme entered a five-week hiatus, starting 18 April 2020 and ending 23 May 2020.

Biz Stream aired its 100th episode on 15 May 2021.

Format
Biz Stream is an "upbeat business programme" dealing with the top business stories and "the latest innovations" from Japan and elsewhere. Every episode includes analysis by an expert guest and starts with a review of the main business headlines of the week.

The main segments are:
 In Depth deals with a business story out of the headlines reviewed at the start of the show.
 On-Site Report features a story of an issue affecting the Japanese or Asia-Pacific business community or their economy, and the way companies deal with it.
 World Perspective is a report from outside Japan, mostly from the Asia Pacific and Southeast Asia regions.
 Global Trends is a feature about sustainable, innovative products and entrepreneurship.

Occasionally, there are special episodes dealing only with one issue, such as a review of the Heisei era from the business side or an investigation on plastic waste exported to Southeast Asia.

The programme is also available on online service NHK Huayu Shijie, broadcast as Shāngyè Xìnxī Liú BIZ STREAM with Simplified Chinese subtitles.

Personalities

Hosts
Shaula Vogue
Raja Pradhan

Former hosts
Phoebe Amoroso (2018-2021)

Reporters
Marie Yanaka
John LaDue

Experts
Makiko Eda, chief representative office of the World Economic Forum Japan
Akie Iriyama, professor at the Waseda Business School
Joseph Kraft, CEO of Rorschach Advisory
Lee Chiwoong, chief economist at Mitsubishi UFJ Morgan Stanley Securities
Yumiko Murakami, head of the OECD Tokyo Centre
Martin Schulz, chief policy economist at Fujitsu
Ken Shibusawa, founder and chairman of Commons Asset Management
Jonathan Soble, visiting fellow, Asia Pacific Initiative
Rintaro Tamaki, president of the Japan Center for International Finance (JCIF)

References

External links
 

Japanese television news shows
2018 Japanese television series debuts
NHK original programming